Athaumasta is a genus of moths of the family Noctuidae. The genus was erected by George Hampson in 1906.

Species
Athaumasta alaarcha Pekarsky, 2019 Kyrgyzstan
Athaumasta argillacea Volynkin & Pekarsky, 2016 eastern Kazakhstan
Athaumasta arida Volynkin & Saldaitis, 2019 Altai
Athaumasta dzhungarica Volynkin & Saldaitis, 2019 Altai
Athaumasta etugen Volynkin & Saldaitis, 2019 Altai
Athaumasta expressa (Lederer, 1855) Altai
Athaumasta gracilis (Draudt, 1931) Kirghizia
Athaumasta kegena Pekarsky, 2018 south-eastern Kazakhstan
Athaumasta koreana Ronkay & Kononenko, 1998
Athaumasta kuchinichi Volynkin, Titov & Saldaitis, 2019 north-eastern Kasakhstan
Athaumasta kurchuma Volynkin & Titov, 2019 eastern Kazakhstan
Athaumasta kyrkyza Pekarsky, 2017 Kyrgyzstan
Athaumasta lithoplasta (Hampson, 1908) western Turkestan
Athaumasta melyakhi Pekarsky, 2017 Kyrgyzstan
Athaumasta miltina (Püngeler, 1902) Krighizia
Athaumasta nana (Staudinger, 1896)
Athaumasta pekarskyi Volynkin, 2012
Athaumasta siderigera (Christoph, 1893) Sajan
Athaumasta simplivalva (Hacker & Schreier, 2010) Cape Verde
Athaumasta splendida Bang-Haas, 1927 Sajan
Athaumasta tarbagata Volynkin, Titov & Saldaitis, 2019 eastern Kazakhstan

References

Cuculliinae